Josiane Mathon-Poinat (born 23 August 1954 in La Ricamarie, Loire) is a member of the Senate of France, representing the Loire department. She is a member of the French Communist Party, and of the Communist, Republican, and Citizen Group. Mathon-Poinat was first elected to the Senate on September 3, 2001.

Biography  
Mathon-Poinat was originally a secretary, before being elected to the municipal council of La Ricamarie and becoming the first deputy mayor in 2001.

Mathon-Poinat was registered in the Communist Group, as a republican and citizen and Senators of the Left Party (CRC-GSP). She is a member of the Committee on Constitutional laws, legislation, universal suffrage, regulations, and general administration of the Senate. She is a member of the Delegation for Women's Rights and Equal Opportunities between men and women, and is also a member of the Steering Board of the administrative simplification.

Her term ended on 30 September 2011.

References
Page on the Senate website

1954 births
Living people
People from Loire (department)
Politicians from Auvergne-Rhône-Alpes
French Communist Party politicians
French Senators of the Fifth Republic
Senators of Loire (department)
Women members of the Senate (France)
21st-century French women politicians